Daedong Credit Bank (DCB) is a North Korean bank, established in 1995, and based in the country's capital, Pyongyang.

DCB has been on the US Treasury sanctions list since June 2013, for "its role in supporting Pyongyang's weapons of mass destruction program". Also sanctioned were DCB Financial Limited, and its representative, Kim Chol-sam, and Son Mun San, the external affairs bureau chief of North Korea's Bureau of Atomic Energy.

See also

North Korea's illicit activities

References

External links

Banks of North Korea
1995 establishments in North Korea
Banks established in 1995